{{DISPLAYTITLE:C13H21N5O2}}
The molecular formula C13H21N5O2 (molar mass: 279.34 g/mol, exact mass: 279.1695 u) may refer to:

 Etamiphylline
 Tezampanel